"Classic" is a song by British singer-songwriter Adrian Gurvitz. It was released as a single in early 1982 and is the title track of his 1982 album Classic. The song was a hit in his native UK, reaching the top 10 and peaking at No. 8 on the UK Singles Chart as well as reaching No. 12 in Australia. It was one of the most played ballads in England in 1982.

Charts

Weekly charts

Year-end charts

References

1982 songs
1982 singles
British soft rock songs
RAK Records singles
Songs written by Adrian Gurvitz
1980s ballads